Soure may refer to the following places:

 Soure, Pará, a municipality in the State of Pará, Brazil
 Soure, Portugal, a municipality in the district of Coimbra, Portugal

See also
 Nova Soure, a municipality in the State of Bahia, Brazil